Hong Il-chon (born 1942) was the first wife of Kim Jong-il. She was the daughter of a soldier who died during the Korean War. In the early 1960s, Kim Il-sung, father of Kim Jong-il, introduced her to his son and handpicked her to marry him in 1966. Her only daughter is named Kim Hye-gyong, born in 1968, and is the first child of Kim Jong-il. They divorced in 1969.

Hong Il-chon held a degree in Russian Literature from Kim Il-sung University. After her divorce from Kim Jong-il, she was still active in politics and educational affairs. She became one of the members of the Supreme People's Assembly during the period between 1977 and 1991. After she withdrew from the Assembly, she was appointed as principal of Kim Hyong Jik University of Education in September 1991. She retired from that post in July 2012 at the age of 70.

References

Living people
People from Pyongyang
1942 births
Kim dynasty (North Korea)